Brigitte et Brigitte is a 1966 French feature-length film written and directed by Cahiers du cinéma film critic Luc Moullet. Moullet's debut film, Brigitte et Brigitte was praised upon release by one-time colleague Jean-Luc Godard as being a "revolutionary film."

External links

1966 films
1960s French-language films
French black-and-white films
1966 comedy films
French comedy films
1960s French films